Dukey may refer to:

 an anthropomorphic dog character in the Canadian animated television series Johnny Test
 Dukey Flyswatter, stage name of American actor, screenwriter and musician Michael Sonye (born 1954)
 family nickname of Harold Lloyd Jr. (1931–1971), American actor and singer, son of Harold Lloyd
 James Dukey, a clarinet player with the San Francisco Ballet